The surname Plumb may refer to:
Caroline Plumb (born 1978), British businesswoman
Dick Plumb (born 1946), English footballer
Edward H. Plumb (1907–1958), American film composer
Eve Plumb (born 1958), American actress and painter
Gwen Plumb (1912–2002), Australian actress
Henry Plumb, Baron Plumb (1925–2022), British politician
John Plumb (disambiguation), several people
Josiah Burr Plumb (1816–1888), Canadian politician
Lois Plumb (1924 - 2002), Canadian psychiatrist
Preston B. Plumb (1837–1891), American politician
Ralph Plumb (1816–1903), American politician
Rovana Plumb (born 1960), Romanian politician

See also
Plumb (singer) (born 1975), American Christian musician
Plumbe (disambiguation)

English-language surnames